The Fortress of O Castro is a hilltop fortress in Vigo, (province of Pontevedra), Spain built in 1665 during the Portuguese Restoration War in order to protect the city from the continuous raids by the British Royal Navy, allies of Portugal.

Built on the hill of the same name, the defensive system of the city consisted of the fortresses of O Castro and San Sebastián and the now disappeared city wall. The city wall had an irregular shape due to the orography of the city, it was constructed by the Engineer Colonel Fernando de Gourannanbergue and maestre de campo Diego Arias Taboada to link the two fortresses. Despite this effort to provide security to the city, documents from that time say that this defensive system was ineffective as it could not impede landings further along the coast.

After several attempts to improve the defenses of the city, Vigo was looted again by British navy on the 23–24 October 1702 during Battle of Vigo Bay at the War of the Spanish Succession. The fortress and Vigo fell once more to a British force during the War of the Quadruple Alliance in October 1719.

In 1809, the fortress was occupied by the French army during Peninsular War; on 28 March that year the fortress was reconquered following an uprising by people of Vigo, because of the city was given the honorific title of "the faithful, loyal and courageous city of Vigo" the following year.

Nowadays the fortress is one of the preferred sites for people to take a walk in Vigo, because his beautiful gardens, open spaces, fonts and also the privileged views.

Gallery

References

External links
 Map and Description 
 Information Spanish
 More Photos Spanish
 Castro Fortress at Google Maps

Vigo
Buildings and structures in the Province of Pontevedra
Tourist attractions in Galicia (Spain)
Buildings and structures completed in 1665
1665 establishments in Spain